Kristiyan Katsarev (born 7 August 1995) is a Bulgarian footballer who plays as a goalkeeper.

Career
In July 2017, Katsarev joined Lokomotiv Gorna Oryahovitsa.

In June 2018, he moved to Tsarsko Selo.

Club statistics

Club

References

External links
 
 
 

Living people
1995 births
Footballers from Plovdiv
Bulgarian footballers
Bulgaria youth international footballers
Association football goalkeepers
FC Lokomotiv 1929 Sofia players
PFC Lokomotiv Plovdiv players
FC Lokomotiv Gorna Oryahovitsa players
FC Tsarsko Selo Sofia players
FC Vereya players
FC Vitosha Bistritsa players
First Professional Football League (Bulgaria) players
Second Professional Football League (Bulgaria) players